Ghota Fateh garh is one of the oldest villages of the Narowal District

History

The history of this village can be divided into three eras with evidences and sites.. 
1. Current Era 
Current era has roots, started from 1947 , before that Majority of population of this village was Sikhs and Hindus. currently, our village has population more than 10 thousands with various schools, mosques and one graveyard. 
2. Middle / Historical Era
It includes the time before partition 1947 , in Middle Era , when Hindu Muslims and Sikhs were living side by side in this village. village had many Guruduaras and temples. even one Mosque. Some Temples were even present till 2007. Because of lack of care and involvement of local villagers, temples are no more now. 
3. Pre-Historical Era. 
There is a pre-historical period which is unknown and untold. There is a great mound in our village, no one knows about its history. It was too high till 1980's but with passage of time and establishment of houses there, its height has been reduced . This mound has having proofs, that there was a city or some other village there, which has been burried under tons of mud. We can see thousands of broken pottery and bricks there. 
Similar mounds are present in nearby villages even beyond border (Amritsar and Gurudaspur) 
According to the book "Why i am Bhuddist" (by Harbans Virdee), these mounds are remains of villages/cities which belong to ancient Buddhist Era. Some coins are also found which are related to "Kushan Dynasty" Of First century. Hence, this village has ancient history. 

اس گاؤں کی تاریخ کو شواہد اور مقامات کے ساتھ تین ادوار میں تقسیم کیا جا سکتا ہے۔ 1. موجودہ دور موجودہ دور کی جڑیں ہیں، جو 1947 سے شروع ہوئی، اس سے پہلے اس گاؤں کی اکثریت سکھوں اور ہندوؤں کی تھی۔ اس وقت ہمارے گاؤں کی آبادی 10 ہزار سے زیادہ ہے جس میں مختلف اسکول، مساجد اور ایک قبرستان ہے۔ 2. درمیانی/ تاریخی دور تقسیم 1947 سے پہلے کا وقت شامل کریں، درمیانی دور میں، جب اس گاؤں میں ہندو مسلمان اور سکھ ساتھ ساتھ رہتے تھے۔ گاؤں میں بہت سے گرودوار اور مندر تھے۔ یہاں تک کہ ایک مسجد۔ کچھ مندر 2007 تک بھی موجود تھے۔ مقامی دیہاتیوں کی دیکھ بھال اور شمولیت کی کمی کی وجہ سے اب مندر نہیں رہے۔ 3. قبل از تاریخی دور۔ ایک ماقبل تاریخی دور ہے جو نامعلوم اور ناقابل بیان ہے۔ ہمارے گاؤں میں ایک بہت بڑا ٹیلہ ہے، اس کی تاریخ کے بارے میں کوئی نہیں جانتا۔ 1980 کی دہائی تک یہ بہت اونچی تھی لیکن وقت گزرنے کے ساتھ ساتھ وہاں مکانات کے قیام سے اس کی اونچائی کم ہوتی گئی ہے۔ اس ٹیلے کے پاس ثبوت موجود ہیں، کہ وہاں کوئی شہر یا کوئی اور گاؤں تھا، جو کئی ٹن مٹی کے نیچے دب گیا ہے۔ ہم وہاں ہزاروں ٹوٹے ہوئے مٹی کے برتن اور اینٹیں دیکھ سکتے ہیں۔ اسی طرح کے ٹیلے قریبی دیہاتوں میں بھی موجود ہیں حتیٰ کہ سرحد سے آگے (امرتسر اور گروداسپور) کتاب "Why I am Bhuddist" (بذریعہ ہربنس وردی) کے مطابق، یہ ٹیلے دیہاتوں/شہروں کی باقیات ہیں جو قدیم بدھ دور سے تعلق رکھتے ہیں۔ کچھ سکے ایسے بھی ملے ہیں جن کا تعلق پہلی صدی کے "کوشن خاندان" سے ہے۔ اس لیے اس گاؤں کی تاریخ قدیم ہے۔

Etymology 
There are several theories as to the origin of the name. The most famous of them is that it was named after Ghotam Rakhi who lived there. The village Is located approximately 7–8  km from  Narowal. It is on the Ravi River about 8–9 km from the Indian border. The village has rice and wheat as its main agricultural products.
There is a big play ground where many games are played i.e Cricket (Hard ball+Tape ball), Football, Woli ball.

Demographics

Languages
Languages spoken in the Village are:
 Punjabi (Majority)
 Mewati
Other Languages include:
 Urdu (national language)
 English

List of educational institutions 
 Govt. Higher Secondary School ( Boys )
 Govt. Higher Secondary school ( girls )
 Iqra Public model school
 Dar-e-arqam School (Madina Branch)
 City School System

References

Villages in Narowal District